"Soldier of Fortune" is an electronic pop song by Australian pop singer John Paul Young, written by John Capek and Marc Jordan, and released in 1983. The song peaked at number 17 on the Australian Kent Music Report and stayed in the chart for 19 weeks. 

The song gained further prominence when it was picked as the theme song for the 1984 Disabled Olympics held in New York, and it also went on to be a hit in Germany.

Track listing 
 Soldier of Fortune (John Capek, Marc Jordan) – 4:34
 The Sirens (John Paul Young, Warren Morgan) – 4:06 
 Soldier of Fortune  (J. Capek, M. Jordan) (Extended) – 5:09

Personnel 
Rick Lewis – cover
SNB – mastering
Tony Beuttel – engineer, mixing, producer (track: 2)
Mike Stavrou  – engineer
John Capek – producer (tracks: 1)
John Paul Young – producer  (track: 2)
Warren Morgan – producer  (track: 2)

Charts

Other recordings
The song was also recorded by The Manhattan Transfer on their 1983 album Bodies and Souls. Cowriter Marc Jordan released two separate versions of the song, one on the soundtrack album of the film Youngblood and another, featuring a slower arrangement, on his 1987 album Talking Through Pictures.

References

1983 songs
1983 singles
John Paul Young songs
Songs written by John Capek
Songs written by Marc Jordan